The 2020–21 East Midlands Counties Football League season was the 13th and final season of the East Midlands Counties Football League, a football competition in England at level 10 of the English football league system. The allocations for Steps 3 to 6 for season 2020–21 were announced by the FA on 21 July 2020.

The season started in September and was suspended in December a result of the Covid-19 pandemic. The league season was subsequently abandoned in February 2021.

Promotions and restructuring
The scheduled restructuring of non-League took place at the end of the season, with new divisions added to the Combined Counties and United Counties leagues at Step 5 for 2021-22, along with new a division in the Northern Premier League at step 4. Promotions from Steps 6 to 5 were based on points per game across all matches over the two cancelled seasons (2019-20 and 2020-21), while teams were promoted into Step 6 on the basis of a subjective application process. The East Midlands Counties League disbanded after most of its remaining clubs were assigned to the Northern Counties East and United Counties leagues' Step 6 divisions.

Premier Division

The league featured 19 clubs from the previous season, along with one new club:
 Ollerton Town, transferred from the Northern Counties East League Division One

League table

Stadia and locations

References

2020–21
10
England